Balloon Farm is a historic home located at Frankfort in Herkimer County, New York. It includes the Gates-Myers Residence, built in 1878.  It is an imposing, nearly square, three-story eclectic Late Victorian dwelling built of dimension lumber above a cut-stone foundation.

In 1889, the property was purchased by Carl Edgar Myers (1842–1925), an aeronautical engineer who established an aeronautical institution known as "Balloon Farm." His wife Mary, known as "Carlotta, the Lady Aeronaut", made many ascents in balloons in aid of his experiments. She is noted by a historical marker near the property.

The property was listed on the National Register of Historic Places in 1998.

Gallery

References

Houses on the National Register of Historic Places in New York (state)
Victorian architecture in New York (state)
Houses completed in 1878
Houses in Herkimer County, New York
National Register of Historic Places in Herkimer County, New York